David McCleary Sheldon (born July 25, 1981), known professionally as Mac Lethal, is an American rapper, songwriter and author from Kansas City, Missouri. He is the founder of Black Clover Records and formerly a radio host on KRBZ 96.5 the Buzz show, Black Clover Radio.

Career
Mac Lethal released his debut studio album, Men Are from Mars, Pornstars Are from Earth, on HHI Recordings in 2002. In that year, he won the Scribble Jam rap battle. Sage Francis took him on the Fuck Clear Channel Tour in 2004.

In 2006, Mac Lethal founded Black Clover Records with longtime friend Jeremy Willis, who had been running the Datura Label. In 2007, he released a studio album, 11:11, on Rhymesayers Entertainment.

In 2011, he was offered a contract from Sony which he rejected, referring to the $250,000, 5 album, 2 option and one milestone option deal as "insane".

On November 30, 2011, Mac Lethal posted a video on YouTube of him rapping over the beat to Chris Brown's "Look at Me Now" while he prepares a dish of pancakes in his kitchen. The video became a viral hit and got millions of views in a matter of days, leading to interviews on websites like CNN and The Washington Post. It was included on Spins "10 Most Contagiously Viral Musical Web Sensations of 2011" list. In that year, he also released a studio album, Irish Goodbye, on Black Clover Records.

Mac Lethal also runs a Tumblr feed called "Texts from Bennett", in which he posts text message conversations between himself and his cousin Bennett. Although some have questioned whether or not Bennett is a real person, he insists that the conversations are genuine. He released the novel of the same name on Simon & Schuster in 2013.

Mac Lethal and Amber Diamond host the television show, Binge Thinking, which premiered on MTV2 on April 1, 2016. On September 13, 2016, he released a studio album, Congratulations, which featured a guest appearance from Tech N9ne.

Before the Chiefs victory in Super Bowl LIV, he released a song titled "Kansas Chiefs Anthem 2020". In the song he references multiple Chiefs players from that season.

Discography

 Men Are from Mars, Pornstars Are from Earth (2002)
 11:11 (2007)
 Irish Goodbye (2011)
 Congratulations (2016)
  Winter Heartbreak II  (2021)

Books
 Texts from Bennett: A Novel (2013)

References

External links
 
 
 

1981 births
Living people
American male rappers
American hip hop record producers
Rappers from Kansas City, Missouri
Rhymesayers Entertainment artists
Underground rappers
American male songwriters
Songwriters from Missouri
Writers from Missouri
American radio personalities
Radio personalities from Kansas City, Missouri
Midwest hip hop musicians
Record producers from Missouri
American male bloggers
American bloggers
21st-century American rappers
21st-century American male musicians